Oomorphidius is a genus of flower weevils in the beetle family Curculionidae. There are at least two described species in Oomorphidius.

Species
These two species belong to the genus Oomorphidius:
 Oomorphidius erasus (LeConte, 1880)
 Oomorphidius laevicollis (LeConte, 1876)

References

Further reading

 
 
 

Baridinae
Articles created by Qbugbot